The 2016 OFC U-17 Women's Championship was the 3rd edition of the OFC U-17 Women's Championship, the biennial international youth football championship organised by the Oceania Football Confederation (OFC) for the women's under-17 national teams of Oceania. The tournament was held in the Cook Islands between 13–23 January 2016. The tournament, which returned after the previous edition in 2014 was cancelled, was originally scheduled to be held between 13–28 September 2015.

Same as previous editions, the tournament acted as the OFC qualifiers for the FIFA U-17 Women's World Cup. The winner of the tournament qualified for the 2016 FIFA U-17 Women's World Cup in Jordan as the OFC representative.

New Zealand were crowned as champions for the third consecutive time on 24 January 2016, sealing their qualification to the World Cup.

Teams
A total of nine OFC member national teams entered the tournament.

Withdrew

Venue
The matches were played at the CIFA Academy Field and Takitumu School in Matavera.

Squads

Players born on or after 1 January 1999 were eligible to compete in the tournament.

Group stage
The draw for the group stage was held on 19 October 2015 at the OFC Headquarters in Auckland, New Zealand. The nine teams were divided into one group of five teams and one group of four teams, with each group played in round-robin format. The top two teams of each group advance to the semi-finals.

After the withdrawal of the Solomon Islands from the tournament, the Group A fixtures were re-drawn on 3 November 2015 at the OFC Headquarters. As a result, the tournament also starts four days later from its original start date of 9 January 2016.

All times are local, CKT (UTC−10).

Group A

Group B

Knockout stage

Bracket

Semi-finals

Third place match

Final
Winner qualified for 2016 FIFA U-17 Women's World Cup.

Winners

New Zealand qualified for the FIFA U-17 Women's World Cup for the fifth consecutive time.

1 Bold indicates champion for that year. Italic indicates host for that year.

Awards
The following awards were given at the conclusion of the tournament.

Goalscorers
14 goals
 Hannah Blake

10 goals
 Jacqui Hand

9 goals
 Samantha Tawharu

7 goals

 Belinda Giada
 Maggie Jenkins

6 goals
 Jackie Pahoa

5 goals

 Cema Nasau
 Emma Main

3 goals

 Moeroa Harmon
 Katinka Takamatsu
 Sarah Krystman
 Anna Malara

2 goals

 Koleta Likuculacula
 Michaela Foster
 Gabe Jillings
 Robertlynn Kig
 Annie Gere

1 goal

 Nicole Marurai
 Daimzel Rongokea
 Susan Williams
 Aliza Hussein
 Jessica Ali Said
 Lucinda Koindredi
 Elise Lalie
 Joelle Leme
 Claudia Bunge
 Selina Unamba
 Sophia Aveau
 Alexandra Fifita
 Mele Kafa
 Seini Lutu
 Ana Polovili
 Keren Coulon
 Cynthia Ngwele
 Leimata Simon

Own goals

 1 own goal (playing against New Zealand)
 1 own goal (playing against Fiji)
 1 own goal (playing against Fiji)
 1 own goal (playing against New Zealand)

References

External links
2016 OFC U-17 Women's Championship, oceaniafootball.com

2016
2016 in women's association football
2015–16 in OFC football
2016 OFC U-17 Women's Championship
2016 in Cook Islands sport
2016 in youth sport
2016 in youth association football